North Tamborine is a rural town in the locality of Tamborine Mountain  in the Scenic Rim Region, Queensland, Australia.

Geography

History 
Many early settlers grew maize and grazed dairy cattle. The first guesthouse on the mountain was opened in 1889.

A tourist road to the mountain was completed in 1924. The road brought visitors to the area and the North Tamborine village became the centre for social and business activities. North Tamborine Post Office opened by 1922.

A section of Tamborine National Park  known as The Knoll protects forests found in the north of the suburb.

Formerly a suburb in its own right, in 1997, North Tamborine was merged with other former suburbs Eagle Heights and Mount Tamborine to create the larger locality of Tamborine Mountain.

Heritage listings
North Tamborine has a number of heritage-listed sites, including:
 Geissmann Drive: Tamborine Mountain Road

See also

 Tamborine National Park

References

External links 

Towns in Queensland
Tamborine Mountain
Scenic Rim Region